The 1940 United States presidential election in Florida was held on November 5, 1940, as part of the concurrent United States presidential election. Florida voters chose seven electors, or representatives to the Electoral College, who voted for president and vice president.

Background
Florida had been one of the most solid members of the "Solid South" ever since the 1889 poll tax disfranchised almost all blacks and most poor whites. Unlike southern states extending into the Appalachian Mountains or Ozarks, or Texas with its German settlements in the Edwards Plateau, Florida completely lacked upland or German "Forty-Eighter" whites opposed to secession. Thus disfranchisement of blacks left the party moribund – fifty years after disfranchisement, half of all Florida's registered Republicans were still black although a negligible number had ever voted.

Immigration of northerners into the previously undeveloped areas of South Florida, along with fierce anti-Catholicism in the northern Piney Woods, did give Herbert Hoover a freakish victory in 1928, but apart from that the Democratic Party had lost only six counties at a presidential level since 1892.

Following FDR's second successive sweep of all sixty-seven counties in 1936, Senator Claude Pepper and Miami politicians led a successful push to abolish the poll tax because of the corruption it was causing. Repeal of the poll tax produced significant increases in the total vote cast vis-à-vis that of 1936: the presidential vote increased by around forty-seven percent, and in gubernatorial primaries the absolute increase in percent turnout was over eleven percent of the total voting age white population.

Nonetheless, almost all of this new electorate remained white due to the white primary. Aided by considerable sympathy amongst Florida's largely English-descended white population for the United Kingdom's cause in ongoing World War II, Roosevelt was to sweep every county in Florida for the third successive election and for the ninth occasion in thirteen elections since the recently abolished poll tax was originally imposed. Willkie, who improved by over eight percent upon Alf Landon's performance in 1936, gained less than half that amount in Florida.

As of 2020, this is the penultimate election that every county in Florida voted Democratic and the last time that every county voted more Democratic than the nation at-large.

Results

Results by county

Notes

References 

Florida
1940
1940 Florida elections